Saint-Michel station is located on Line C of the tramway de Bordeaux.

Situation
The station is located at quai de la Grave in Bordeaux in the popular neighborhood of St-Michel known for its Sunday market. The area is home to a large population of immigrant Spanish, Portuguese, North African and Turkish.

Junctions
There are no junctions with other lines or buses at this station.

Close by
 Basilique Saint-Michel
 Les quais

See also
 TBC
 Tramway de Bordeaux

Bordeaux tramway stops
Tram stops in Bordeaux
Railway stations in France opened in 2004